Black Mountain is the debut album by Black Mountain released by Jagjaguwar in 2005. In 2015 an expanded 16 track version was re-released.

Track listing
All songs written by Stephen McBean.
 "Modern Music" – 2:44
 "Don't Run Our Hearts Around" – 6:03
 "Druganaut" – 3:47
 "No Satisfaction" – 3:47
 "Set Us Free" – 6:45
 "No Hits" – 6:45
 "Heart of Snow" – 7:59
 "Faulty Times" – 8:34
 "Bonus Track; Jonny Svenson Lives" - 10:21

Critical Reception
Pitchfork provided a mostly positive review, stating Black Mountain provided "perfect amount of tarnish to make the songs feel lived-in without burying them in fry grease."

References

See also 
Amazon.com's Top 100 Editor's Picks of 2005 (#90)

2005 debut albums
Black Mountain (band) albums
Jagjaguwar albums